Dietrich I, or Theodoric I, may refer to:

 Theodoric I of Wettin (ca. 916 – ca. 976)
 Dietrich I of Metz (died 984)
 Dietrich I, Duke of Upper Lorraine (born c. 965, died in 1026 or 1027)
 Dietrich I, Count of Cleves (ruled 1092–1119)
 Dietrich I, Margrave of Lusatia (ca. 1118 – 1185)
 Theodoric I, Margrave of Meissen (1162–1221)
 Dietrich I von Hengebach (born around 1150, died after 1223)
 Dietrich I of Isenberg (before 1215 – 1301)
 Dietrich Schenk von Erbach (died in 1459)